Krushnaa Patil is an Indian mountaineer. In 2009, at the age of 19, she became the youngest Indian woman to successfully ascent Mount Everest, earth's highest mountain.

Her record of the youngest Indian to climb Everest has subsequently been surpassed by younger mountaineers. In 2010, Patil attempted to ascent the Seven Summits. Her last summit on Mount Denali had to be abandoned due to technical reasons, leaving her one short of completing the feat.

Mountaineering 
For Krushnaa Patil's family, vacations were always in the Himalayas. She enrolled in the Nehru Institute of Mountaineering (NIM) at Uttarkashi for a Basic Mountaineering Course in 2007 followed by an Advance Mountaineering Course in 2008.

Soon after, Patil got the chance to be a part of the pre-Everest expedition, and at 18, became the youngest person to scale Mount Satopanth in Garhwal Himalayas, Uttarakhand. Everest followed in May 2009, when she became the second youngest Indian (after Dicky Dolma) to summit the peak.

Patil reached the summit of Mount Everest and became the youngest person to scale Everest in 2009. In the same year, she summited Mount Vinson Massif in Antarctica.

In 2010, she summited Aconcagua followed by Mount Elbrus, the highest peak in Europe.

After mountaineering

Krushnaa was a part of an international expedition on clean water access and conservation program, which, through 2014 - 2020, promoted access to fresh water around the world with a team of eight women, from six continents.

As of 2018, Krushnaa is a chef at a restaurant in Srinagar.

See also
Indian summiters of Mount Everest - Year wise
List of Mount Everest summiters by number of times to the summit
List of Mount Everest records of India
List of Mount Everest records

References

External links
 Official website
 Krushnaa Patil on Twitter
 "Access Water - Ganges" Facebook Page
 Everester Krushnaa Patil goes back to help trekkers
 State’s Everest girl to help rural Nepal’s economy
 Himalayan Tragedy: Krushnaa pitches tent to help

Living people
Sportswomen from Maharashtra
Indian female mountain climbers
Indian mountain climbers
Indian summiters of Mount Everest
1989 births
Sportspeople from Mumbai
21st-century Indian women
21st-century Indian people